Nwaozo Obiajulu (1973 — 2011) popularly known as MC Loph was a Nigerian Igbo rapper. He shot into limelight with "Osondi Owendi" a single remix of Osadebe's hit song which featured Flavour N'abania. He died on 14 September 2011.

References 

1973 births
2011 deaths
Igbo rappers
Nigerian male rappers
21st-century Nigerian musicians
21st-century male musicians